Avery Wilson (born July 18, 1995) is an American singer, songwriter and dancer. Wilson gained notice in 2012 as a contestant on season 3 of The Voice. Since then, he has been making duets with his fans on Smule Sing! as @AveryWilson. Prior to The Voice, Wilson had regional hit songs played in rotation in the Connecticut, New York and Massachusetts markets. In 2015 he released "If I Have To", the first single from his debut album which he also performed as a non-competitor on season 8 of The Voice.

Early life and education

Wilson never saw himself as a singer until his father overheard him singing and recognized the talent. His father began holding open mic nights at one of the 14 area McDonald's that he oversaw as the director of operations. The open mic nights were to help the local community have a safe place to have fun and also showcase his son's talent. Wilson was 9 years old at the time and still returns to the location to help with the event.

Wilson was raised in Hamden, Connecticut, where he attended Hamden Middle School. He attended Cooperative Arts and Humanities High School located in New Haven, Connecticut.

Career

One of Wilson's first singles, Ringtone, was a demo that was sent to radio station WYBC-FM in New Haven, CT. The demo was sent in by his father and it received airplay, becoming a hit in the regional market of Connecticut, New York, and Massachusetts. Wilson was first discovered by Sean Garrett who began working with him. He entered the Next Teen Superstar competition in New York in 2011 and was the co-winner of the competition. In 2012 he self-released On Top of the World, a digital download available through iTunes.

Wilson appeared on season 3 of The Voice when he was 16 years old. He performed on team Cee Lo Green and made it to the knockouts. Wilson was a favorite to win the competition but was eliminated on October 29, 2012, after his performance of Yeah 3x. His elimination was called a major upset by numerous publications and he later signed with Clive Davis and RCA Records. He returned to The Voice Season 8 in 2015 to sing If I Have To, the first single from his debut album. Wilson later announced that he would perform at the BET Awards in 2015 on June 28, 2015.

On October 29, 2018, Avery released his new 5-song project called FYI onto mainstream. The song "Dollar Bill" was released as his first single. The song expressed the meaning of "not putting up with bullshit." He released his second single, "Wass the Move" with had a hip-hop feel to it. Avery's other three tracks included "Do For You", "Use 2", and "Touch Down".

In 2019, Avery released a 4-song project called 8:34.

Personal life
Wilson came out as bisexual in a tweet on his 25th birthday on July 18, 2020.

Discography

Extended plays

Singles

References

External links
 Avery Wilson official website
 

1995 births
Living people
African-American male singers
American male pop singers
American rhythm and blues singer-songwriters
Bisexual men
Bisexual musicians
Dancers from Connecticut
LGBT African Americans
LGBT people from Connecticut
American LGBT singers
People from Hamden, Connecticut
RCA Records artists
African-American songwriters
Singer-songwriters from Connecticut
The Voice (franchise) contestants